Nora, Princess, and Stray Cat, released in English as The Princess, the Stray Cat, and Matters of the Heart, is a Japanese adult visual novel developed by Harukaze and was released for Windows on February 26, 2016. A 12-episode anime television series adaptation aired from July to September 2017. PlayStation Vita (PSV) version of the game was released on September 28, 2017.

Gameplay
Nora, Princess, and Stray Cat is a romance visual novel in which the player assumes the role of Nora Handa. Much of its gameplay is spent on reading the story's narrative and dialogue. The text in the game is accompanied by character sprites, which represent who Nora is talking to, over background art. Throughout the game, the player encounters CG artwork at certain points in the story, which take the place of the background art and character sprites. The game follows a branching plot line with multiple endings, and depending on the decisions that the player makes during the game, the plot will progress in a specific direction.
There are four main plot lines that the player will have the chance to experience, one for each heroine. Throughout gameplay, the player is given multiple options to choose from, and text progression pauses at these points until a choice is made. Some decisions can lead the game to end prematurely, which offer an alternative ending to the plot. To view all plot lines in their entirety, the player will have to replay the game multiple times and choose different choices to further the plot to an alternate direction. Throughout gameplay, there are scenes with sexual CGs depicting Nora and a given heroine having sex.

Plot
Nora, Princess, and Stray Cat set in a coastal town named . One morning in spring he meets a beautiful girl at a park on his way to school. Her name is Patricia. She is a princess of the underworld whose mission is the eradication of all life. However, she gets sick just after coming to the surface and Nora kindly looks after her while she recovers. Later that same day, a kiss from Patricia transforms Nora into a black cat and the magic of which compels him to serve the demon.

Characters

Main characters
 
 (anime)
The main protagonist and a second-year student of Sakuragabuchi Academy. His mother died several years ago.

 (PC game), Natsumi Takamori (anime, PSV game) 
The main heroine and a princess of the underworld, the place where the dead live. She has two sisters named Lucia and Euracia, and transfers into Sakuragabuchi Academy along with them. 

 (PC game), Eri Sendai (anime, PSV game)
A second-year student and Nora's childhood friend. She has a serious personality and is in the school's discipline committee. She always studies hard and is good in the school. She is the first person who finds out that Nora has transformed into a cat.  

 (PC game), Yū Asakawa (anime, PSV game)
A second-year student who lives along with Nora. She was an orphan whom Nora found at a beach in his childhood. She is good at cooking and weather forecast. She has a quiet personality and a polite manner of speaking.   

 (PC game), Atsumi Tanezaki (anime, PSV game)
A first-year student and Nora's underclasswoman. Although the same age as Nora, she entered Sakuragabuchi Academy a year later than he.

Other characters

 (PC game), Yō Taichi (anime, PSV game)
Patricia's older sister. She looks like strict, but indulges her two younger sisters.

 (PC game), Ayuru Ōhashi (anime, PSV game)
Lucia and Patricia's younger sister. She has a childish personality and is curious about the surface world.

 (PC game), Yuri Yamaoka (anime, PSV game)
A second-year student and Nora's classmate. Her family is a local yakuza.

 (PC game), Juri Kimura (anime, PSV game)
A second-year student and Nora's classmate. She has a shy personality.

 (PC game), Takeaki Masuyama (anime, PSV game)
A second-year male student and Nora's classmate. 

 (PC game)
Patricia, Lucia, and Euracia's mother and the queen of the underworld. She lives in a castle in the underworld.

Development and release
Nora, Princess, and Stray Cat is Harukaze's second game after Love of Love Emperor of Love!, their debut title released on May 31, 2013. The game's first news was released in August 2015.

The game's scenario was written by Hato, the representative director of Harukaze. Hato is also one of the five authors at Wagamama High Spec, a visual novel developed by Madosoft. The character design was provided by Itsuki Ōzora; super deformed illustrations was provided by Haruka Kusakabe. 
 
The game's free trial version, playable the prologue part of the story, became available for download on January 20, 2016, and the full game was released as a limited edition version on February 26, 2016. A special edition version of the game to commemorate the anime adaptation was released on February 24, 2017. A PlayStation Vita (PSV) version of the game was released on September 28, 2017. A sequel game titled  or The Princess, the Stray Cat, and Matters of the Heart 2 was released on October 27, 2017.

Related media

Print 
A 128-page guidebook for the game titled  published from Enterbrain on June 24, 2016. A light novel adaptation written by Kentarō Kobayashi will be published from Ichijinsha on June 30, 2017. A manga adaptation, illustrated by Eku Takeshima, titled  will begin serialization in the August 2017 issue of Dengeki G's Comic to be sold on June 30, 2017. Nobuchina Takada is the main protagonist in the manga.

Anime 
Before the game's release, a short anime television series adaptation was announced on December 29, 2015. The series is directed by Kenshirō Morii and written by Hato. It aired from July 12 to September 20, 2017 on Tokyo MX and Sun TV as a 12-episode series of five-minute shorts. The anime television series' Blu-ray and DVD will be attached to the PlayStation Vita version of the game.

An Internet radio show to promote the anime titled  began airing on May 25, 2017. The show is produced by HiBiKi Radio Station and is streamed online every other Thursday. It is hosted by Atsumi Tanezaki and Yuri Yamaoka, the voice actresses of Yūki Asuhara and Nobuchina Takada.

A new anime project has been announced on November 29, 2018.

Music 

It was written by Hato, composed by Drop, and sung by the voice cast of the main female characters: Yūka Kotorii, Sora Haruka, Misaki Kamishiro, and Hana Kiritani. The song is used as both the opening and ending themes.

There are four insert songs: 
"Re:Start!", written by Yukinoren, composed by Re-D, and sung by Yukinoren.
 "Brave Guardian", written by Shiki, composed by Re-D,  and sung by Yukinoren.
 , written by Tono, composed by Rimo Shinnosuke Mori, and sung by Tono.
  , written by Hato, composed by Pomi, sung by Shirome, and violin performance by Rina Akiyama.

The game's original sound track titled  was released from Harukaze on May 1, 2016.

References

External links
Japanese
Nora, Princess, and Stray Cat official website at Harukaze 
Anime official website
PlayStation Vita game at the anime official website
Nora, Princess, and Crying Cat official website at Harukaze 
English

Visual Novel (English) official website

2017 anime television series debuts
2016 video games
Anime television series based on video games
ASCII Media Works manga
Bishōjo games
Comedy anime and manga
Eroge
Fantasy anime and manga
Japan-exclusive video games
Romance anime and manga
PlayStation Vita games
Seinen manga
School life in anime and manga
Video games developed in Japan
Visual novels
Windows games